Keep the Faith is the fifth studio album by American rock band Bon Jovi, released on November 3, 1992, by Mercury Records. It is Bon Jovi's last studio album to feature all five original band members as bass guitarist Alec John Such was dismissed from the band in 1994. It is Bon Jovi's first album since 1985's 7800° Fahrenheit not to be produced by Bruce Fairbairn. The album was produced by Bob Rock and was recorded at the Little Mountain Sound Studios in Vancouver, British Columbia. Keep the Faith marked a change to a "more serious interpretation of the band's pop-metal groove". It is also Bon Jovi's longest album to date, clocking in at 66 minutes.

Keep the Faith peaked at number five on the US Billboard 200 chart and was certified double-platinum by the Recording Industry Association of America (RIAA). The album produced several hits for the band, including "Keep the Faith", "Bed of Roses" and "In These Arms".

Background
Following the completion of the New Jersey tour, the band went on hiatus. During their time off, Jon Bon Jovi wrote the soundtrack for Young Guns II, which was released in 1990 as the Blaze of Glory album and Richie Sambora released his first solo album called Stranger in This Town. By this time, Jon Bon Jovi fired his longtime manager, Doc McGhee and created Bon Jovi Management. Jon Bon Jovi decided to take on a larger role, and more responsibilities within the band. In October 1991 the band went to the Caribbean island of St. Thomas to discuss plans for the future; the band's internal problems were solved and they were ready to have a go at a comeback.

Recording and production
In January 1992 the band headed to Little Mountain Studios in Vancouver, British Columbia. They spent seven months making the album with Bob Rock producing. Originally the band had approached Bruce Fairbairn, who produced Slippery When Wet and New Jersey, but he was working on Aerosmith's Get a Grip at the time. Most of the recording was done in Vancouver, although a couple of tracks and overdubs were laid down in Los Angeles.

"When we got back together in a room in Vancouver," noted Jon Bon Jovi in 2007, "we closed the door and ignored what had happened to our genre of music. We'd been kicked in the teeth by Nirvana, but we didn't pay attention to that. We got rid of the clichés, wrote some socially conscious lyrics and got a haircut. I didn't do a grunge thing and I didn't do a rap thing. But I knew I couldn't re-write 'Livin' on a Prayer' again, so I didn't try. And it paid off."

Of the thirty songs written for the album, a couple were co-written by David Bryan and a couple by Desmond Child; the rest being by Jon Bon Jovi/Richie Sambora compositions and by Bon Jovi alone. Fourteen songs made it to the final album. Jon Bon Jovi wrote most of the album's songs alone.

Before the band reunited in the studio, Bon Jovi spent the summer of 1991 in anonymity, riding his motorbike in places like Arizona, gaining experiences that inspired him to write "Dry County" and "Bed of Roses". He later commented "It would never have been possible [for me] to write songs like 'Bed of Roses' or 'Dry County' five years ago."

Release and reception

Keep the Faith was released on November 3, 1992. To promote the album, Bon Jovi returned to their roots playing a few dates at the small New Jersey clubs where they had started their career. The band appeared on MTV Unplugged, a different show from the other episodes of the MTV Unplugged series, capturing Bon Jovi in an intimate, "in the round" experience, performing acoustic and electric renditions of classic hits (Bon Jovi and non-Bon Jovi tracks) and new material from Keep the Faith. The concert was released commercially in 1993 as Keep the Faith: An Evening with Bon Jovi.

The album was released on high-definition SACD in August 2017.

Commercial performance
In the US, Keep the Faith debuted at number five on the Billboard 200 Top Albums in November 1992 while peaking at number one in the UK and Australia. Six singles were released from the album between November 1992 and April 1994, with four singles issued in the United States, and two others released only outside the US.

Promotion

Singles
The album's first single, "Keep the Faith", was released on October 12, 1992, a month before the album. On the US Billboard charts, the song topped the Billboard Mainstream Rock Tracks chart while reaching number twenty nine on the Billboard Hot 100; elsewhere, it reached top ten on the singles charts in UK, Ireland, Canada, Switzerland, Germany, Sweden, Norway, the Netherlands and Australia.

"Bed of Roses" was released as the second single on January 11, 1993. On the US Billboard charts, the song reached number ten on the Hot 100. Elsewhere, it reached number two in Canada and number ten in Australia and Germany. Three more commercial singles were released in 1993. "In These Arms", released on May 3, reached number six in Canada, number nine in the UK, and number ten in Australia and Ireland. It also hit the Top 40 in the US Billboard Hot 100. "I'll Sleep When I'm Dead", released on July 26, reached number seventeen in the UK. "I Believe" was released on September 20, reaching number eleven on the UK Singles Chart in October. On March 7, 1994, the album's last single, "Dry County", was released; it reached number nine on the UK Singles Chart. In October 1994, the album was certified double platinum by the Recording Industry Association of America (RIAA).

Keep the Faith is the third most-represented album in Bon Jovi's concert setlists behind Slippery When Wet and New Jersey. This representation is due entirely to the singles, of which "I'll Sleep When I'm Dead" and the title track have been live staples. Of the pure album tracks, "Blame It on the Love of Rock and Roll" and "I Want You" were each only played once during 1993, whilst "If I Was Your Mother" was performed live only twice during the Keep the Faith Tour and not subsequently. "Little Bit of Soul" has appeared live only twice during special radio sessions and Bon Jovi have performed "Fear" live only six times, all during the French and Spanish legs of the album's supporting tour in April 1993.

Accolades

(*) designates unordered lists.

Track listing

Some Latin American releases feature "Cama de Rosas" (Spanish version of "Bed of Roses") as bonus track.

Some releases misspell "Dry County" as "Dry Country". Other releases misspell "Blame It On The Love Of Rock & Roll" as "Blame In On The Love Of Rock & Roll".

A 1998 edition contains an enhanced CD-ROM video of "Keep the Faith" (Live).

Personnel
Bon Jovi
Jon Bon Jovi – lead vocals, additional guitars
Richie Sambora – lead guitar, backing vocals
Alec John Such – bass, backing vocals
Tico Torres – drums, percussion
David Bryan – keyboards, backing vocals

Additional musicians
Maxine Waters, Oren Waters, Julia Waters, Isabella Lento, Carmela Lento, Myna Matthews – additional background vocals 

Production
Bob Rock – producer
Obie O'Brien, Gary Platt, Randy Staub – engineering
Brian Dobbs, Greg Goldman, Darren Grahn, Ed Korengo, Jim Lavinski, Ulrich Wild – assistant engineers
Bob Rock, Randy Staub – mixing
George Marino – mastering

Charts

Weekly charts

Year-end charts

Decade-end charts

Certifications and sales

References

1992 albums
Bon Jovi albums
Mercury Records albums
Albums produced by Bob Rock
Albums recorded at Little Mountain Sound Studios